Diarrhena americana, also known as American beak grass or American beakgrain, is a native, perennial bunchgrass of North America.

Historically, Diarrhena americana was the only species of beak grass recognized in the United States; however studies have suggested that the known beak grass is to be classified into two distinct species, Diarrhena americana and Diarrhena obovata.

Distribution
Diarrhena americana naturally occurs throughout the Midwestern United States, including in eastern Oklahoma and Missouri; south to Alabama; east to Kentucky, the Appalachian Mountains and northern Maryland; and north to southern Illinois, Indiana, Ohio, and southern Michigan.

The grass plant lives in rich cove forests and woodlands, preferring to grow in the moist soils of shaded ledges and riverbanks. It grows in rich, moist woodlands from Missouri to Maryland and south to Oklahoma and Alabama.

Description

These perennial plants can grow flowers that grow above the foliage, with 3 inch tall floral spikes, during the early to mid-summer.

By late summer the flowers turn into hard, brown seed heads. Each seed is reduced to a blunt beak, which is where the common name of beak grass comes from, and this beak is dispersed.

Cultivation
Diarrhena americana is cultivated as an ornamental grass, grown in traditional and wildlife gardens, and in natural landscaping projects.

It is considered an easy plant to grow and maintain, not needing much sun or water while generally being a tough plant. It will tolerate drought, heavy shade, competition from eastern black walnuts, and urban air pollution. When available, the plant will grow into dense clumps in moist rich soils in full shade.

Conservation
Diarrhena americana is a listed endangered species in Maryland and Wisconsin, and a threatened species in Michigan.

References

Koyama, T. and S. Kawano. 1964. Critical taxa of grasses with North American and eastern Asiatic distribution. Can. J. Bot. 42:859–864.
Tateoka, T. 1960. Cytology in grass systematics: A critical review. Nucleus (Calcutta) 3:81–110.

Pooideae
Flora of North America
Plants described in 1803
Taxa named by Palisot de Beauvois
Drought-tolerant plants